Three Little Birds is an upcoming British historical drama television series written by Lenny Henry in collaboration with Russell T Davies. Developed by Douglas Road and Tiger Aspect Productions under Banijay UK, the six-part series is based on Henry's mother Winifred's experiences arriving in Britain from Jamaica as part of the Windrush generation in 1957.

Synopsis
Two sisters Leah and Chantrelle and their acquaintance Hosanna catch a steamboat from Saint Ann Parish in Jamaica to the United Kingdom, arriving in London's Notting Hill before moving to the Midlands.

Cast
 Rochelle Neil as Leah
 Yazmin Belo as Hosanna
 Saffron Coomber as Chantrelle
 Javone Prince as Aston
 Bobby Gordon as Shelton
 Arthur Darvill as Mr Wantage
 Amy Beth Hayes as Mrs Wantage
 Michelle Fox as Siobhan
 Tierney Turner as Selah Whittaker
 Malachi Hall as Caleb Whittaker
 Shay Descartes as Gideon Whittaker

Production

Development
In December 2020, it was announced ITV had commissioned Three Little Birds from Lenny Henry, who would write and executive produce the six-part fictionalisation of his mother Winifred's stories. Russell T Davies was attached to the project as a script consultant and executive producer. Also set to executive produce were Angela Ferreira of Douglas Road Productions, Lucy Bedford of Tiger Aspect Productions, and Diederick Santer of BritBox International.

Henry described it as a "dream come true. This series will be a tribute to the giants who came before us". Henry described Davies "mentored" him through the writing process. In October 2022, speaking after he picked up the Special Recognition award at the National Television Awards at Wembley Arena, Henry said, "I hope the show will make you laugh and cry and understand how it was for those men and women to swap the sun and the sea for the rain and the cold. They were seeking a better place where not everybody was welcoming. We wanted to make a drama that showed what it took to overcome great adversity. When we can relate to each other it brings us together, right? This is a time for people like us to be together, to be allies, telling all kinds of stories and leaving no one behind. I want to thank everybody who’s helped me to get to where I am."

Casting
The cast was announced in November 2022, with Rochelle Neil, Yazmin Belo, and Saffron Coomber set to star in Three Little Birds. Also joining the cast were Javone Prince, Bobby Gordon, Arthur Darvill, Amy Beth Hayes and Michelle Fox.

Filming
Filming took place at the Green man pub Leamington Spa in September 2022.  Filming locations in the Midlands also included Coventry and Earlsdon, with Spon Street in Coventry  shown as a location with period-era shop signs, transport and decor. Filming was reported in October 2022 at the TSS Duke of Lancaster, which is docked in northeast Wales. November saw filming on Fitton Street in Nuneaton.

Broadcast
With the announcement of ITV's new streaming service ITVX in March 2022, it was revealed Three Little Birds would be launched on the platform in advance of airing on ITV. In June 2022, BritBox boarded the project as an international distributor.

At the 2022 National Television Awards, Henry said Three Little Birds would be on in 2023. The series was showcased at the London Screenings.

References

External links
 

2023 British television series debuts
2020s British drama television series
2020s British television miniseries
Black British television shows
Television shows filmed in England
Television shows filmed in Wales
Television series set in the 1950s
Television shows set in Warwickshire
Television shows set in the West Midlands (county)
Television series by Tiger Aspect Productions
ITV television dramas